A baseball glove or mitt is a large glove (traditionally made of leather; today other options exist) worn by baseball players of 
the defending team, which assists players in catching and fielding balls hit by a batter or thrown by a teammate.

By convention, the glove is described by the handedness of the intended wearer, rather than the hand on which the glove is worn: a glove that fits on the left hand—used by a right-handed thrower—is called a right-handed (RH) or "right-hand throw" (RHT) glove. Conversely, a left-handed glove (LH or LHT) is worn on the right hand, allowing the player to throw the ball with the left hand.

History

Early baseball was a game played without gloves. During the gradual transition to gloves, a player who continued to play without one was called a barehanded catcher; this did not refer to the position of catcher, but rather to the practice of catching with bare hands. The earliest glove was not webbed and not particularly well suited for catching but was used more to swat a ball to the ground so that it could be picked up.

One of the first players believed to have used a baseball glove was Doug Allison, a catcher for the Cincinnati Red Stockings, in 1870, due to an injured left hand. The first confirmed glove use was by Charlie Waitt, a St. Louis outfielder and first baseman who, in 1875, donned a pair of flesh-colored gloves. Glove use slowly caught on as more and more players began using different forms of gloves.

Many early baseball gloves were simple leather gloves with the fingertips cut off, supposedly to allow for the same control of a bare hand but with extra padding. First baseman Albert Spalding, originally skeptical of glove use, influenced more infielders to begin using gloves. Spalding later founded the sporting goods company Spalding, which still manufactures baseball gloves, along with other sports equipment. By the mid-1890s, it was normal for players to wear gloves in the field.

In , Bill Doak, a pitcher for the St. Louis Cardinals, suggested that a web be placed between the first finger and the thumb in order to create a pocket. This design soon became the standard for baseball gloves. Doak patented his design and sold it to Rawlings. His design became the precursor to modern gloves and enabled Rawlings to become the preferred glove of professional players.

For many years, it was customary for fielders to leave their gloves on the field when their team went in to bat.

Baseball gloves have grown progressively larger since their inception. While catching in baseball had always been two-handed, gloves eventually grew to a size that made it easier to catch the ball in the webbing of the glove, using the off-hand to keep the ball from falling out. A glove is typically worn on the non-dominant hand, leaving the dominant hand for throwing the ball; for example, a right-handed player would wear a glove on their left hand.

The shape and size of the baseball glove are governed by official baseball rules. Section 3.00 - EQUIPMENT AND UNIFORMS specifies glove dimensions and materials in parts 3.04 through 3.07.

Modern day 
The structure and quality of the baseball glove have developed greatly over the past century. Today, the production of baseball gloves is much more precise and efficient. This has greatly increased the usefulness and accessibility of baseball gloves to the general population. Currently, Easton is "experimenting with combining leather and Kevlar (used in bullet-proof vests) in a new ultra-lightweight glove line". Manufacturers have also designed new, non-traditional types of gloves to suit non-traditional players. Also, manufacturers are personalizing gloves for high-caliber players to help increase their exposure on national television.

Although there have been numerous advances in baseball glove design, the greatest arguably came with the advent of the catcher's mitt. Yet despite state-of-the-art mitts being used by catchers, a Wake Forest University study of 39 U.S. minor-league players demonstrated that the mitts still do not offer enough protection from hand and wrist injuries.

The highest-quality baseball gloves are typically made of heavy leather. These heavy leather gloves usually take more time for the player to break in. They also provide a tighter, more personalized fit for the player. This is an improvement from youth and recreational gloves, which tend to feature palm pads and/or adjustable Velcro wrist straps. These gloves take less time to break in or are pre-broken in, are less personal and more "one size fits all".

Varieties
Baseball gloves are measured by starting at the top of the index finger of the glove and measuring down the finger, along the inside of the pocket and then out to the heel of the glove. Catcher's mitts, unlike those of other gloves, are measured around the circumference, and they typically have  patterns.

The shape and size of a glove are described by its pattern. Modern gloves have become quite specialized, with position-specific patterns:
Catcher's mitts are called "mitts" because they lack individual fingers, like mittens. They have extra padding and a hinged, claw-like shape that helps them funnel fastballs into the pocket and provide a good target for pitchers. Some catchers use mitts with phosphorescent paint around the ridges to provide a clearer target for the pitcher. In addition, catcher's mitts come in single hinge and dual-hinge varieties. If required to catch a knuckleball, a catcher will typically use an even larger mitt. Some knuckleball catchers have even experimented using first baseman's mitts, as described below.
First baseman's mitts also lack individual fingers. They are generally very long and wide to help them pick or scoop badly thrown balls from infielders. These mitts usually have  patterns, measured from wrist to the tip. Because first basemen are often left-handed, first basemen's mitts are readily available to fit on the right hand. Hank Greenberg is often credited as the first to wear this style of the glove in the field. Some catchers, such as Victor Martinez, use a first base mitt while catching knuckleballers, though doing so comes with a disadvantage: because first basemen are rarely required to make a quick throw to another base, first base mitts tend to make the task of catching base stealers more difficult—a task already complicated by the knuckleball's slow speed and erratic behavior.
Infielders' gloves, unlike the first baseman's mitt, tend to be smaller. They have shallow pockets to allow fielders to remove the ball easily in order to make a quick throw to a base. The webbing is often open to allow dirt to pass through the glove so that infielders do not pull out a handful of dirt when trying to remove the ball from the glove. Infielder's gloves typically have  patterns.
Pitchers' gloves usually have a closed, opaque webbing to allow pitchers to conceal their grip on the ball (which, in part, determines the behavior of the pitch in flight) from the batter. Infield gloves with intricate webbing are also used by pitchers.
Outfielder's gloves are usually quite long with deep pockets to help catch fly balls on the run or in a dive, and to keep outfielders from having to bend down as far to field a ground ball. These gloves typically have  patterns, measured from wrist to the tip. They are frequently worn-in differently from those of infielders, with a flatter squeeze rather than the infielder's rounded style.
Left-hand throw gloves are any of the gloves above, but designed to be worn on the right hand (for left-handed players). Players that utilize the left-hand throw gloves such as Tony Gwynn or Sandy Koufax are most frequently pitchers, first basemen, or outfielders.
Switch-thrower's gloves are gloves with a second thumb pocket on the opposite side of the glove, to allow it to be worn on either side of the hand. At the major league level, this glove has been used only by switch-pitcher Pat Venditte.

Major glove manufacturers
Easton
Hillerich & Bradsby, under the Louisville Slugger brand name
Mizuno
Nokona
Rawlings
Spalding
Wilson
 Akadema

See also

Baseball clothing and equipment
Wicket-keeper's gloves, a similar glove used in cricket

References

External links
"How Products Are Made: Baseball Glove", www.science.enotes.com
"Baseball Glove Leather"

Baseball equipment
Sports gloves